The Guttenberg Public School District is a community public school district that serves students in Pre-kindergarten through eighth grade from Guttenberg, New Jersey, United States.

As of the 2018–19 school year, the district, comprising one school, had an enrollment of 949 students and 82.8 classroom teachers (on an FTE basis), for a student–teacher ratio of 11.5:1.

The district is classified by the New Jersey Department of Education as being in District Factor Group "B", the second-lowest of eight groupings. District Factor Groups organize districts statewide to allow comparison by common socioeconomic characteristics of the local districts. From lowest socioeconomic status to highest, the categories are A, B, CD, DE, FG, GH, I and J.  Guttenberg, however, is not an Abbott district and therefore does not receive nearly as much state aid as any of the Abbotts do.

For ninth through twelfth grades, public school students attend North Bergen High School in North Bergen, as part of a sending/receiving relationship with the North Bergen School District. As of the 2018–19 school year, the high school had an enrollment of 2,376 students and 165.4 classroom teachers (on an FTE basis), for a student–teacher ratio of 14.4:1.

School
Anna L. Klein School had an enrollment of 941 public school students in grades PreK-8 in the 2018–19 school year.
Keith Petry, Principal

Administration
Core members of the district's administration are:
Michelle Rosenberg, Superintendent
Jolene Mantineo, Business Administrator / Board Secretary

Board of education
The district's board of education, with nine members, sets policy and oversees the fiscal and educational operation of the district through its administration. As a Type II school district, the board's trustees are elected directly by voters to serve three-year terms of office on a staggered basis, with three seats up for election each year held (since 2012) as part of the November general election. The board appoints a superintendent to oversee the day-to-day operation of the district.

References

External links
Guttenberg School District: Anna L. Klein School

School Data for the Guttenberg School District, National Center for Education Statistics
North Bergen High School

Guttenberg, New Jersey
New Jersey District Factor Group B
School districts in Hudson County, New Jersey
Public K–8 schools in New Jersey